José Ignacio López Porras (born 1 August 1970) is a Spanish dressage rider. He won a team bronze medal at the 2005 European Dressage Championships aboard Nevado Santa Clara. He also competed at the 2006 World Equestrian Games.

References

External links
 

Living people
1970 births
Spanish male equestrians
Spanish dressage riders